The Longai River is a trans-boundary river in India and Bangladesh. It rises in the Jampui Hills of the Indian state of Tripura. It flows through some part of Mizoram before entering Karimganj district of Assam. Later it enters Bangladesh, and drains in Hakaluki Haor.

See also
 List of rivers in Bangladesh

Notes

Rivers of Bangladesh
Rivers of Tripura
Rivers of Assam
Rivers of India
Rivers of Sylhet Division
International rivers of Asia